= Shefali Gupta =

Indian politician (born 1976)

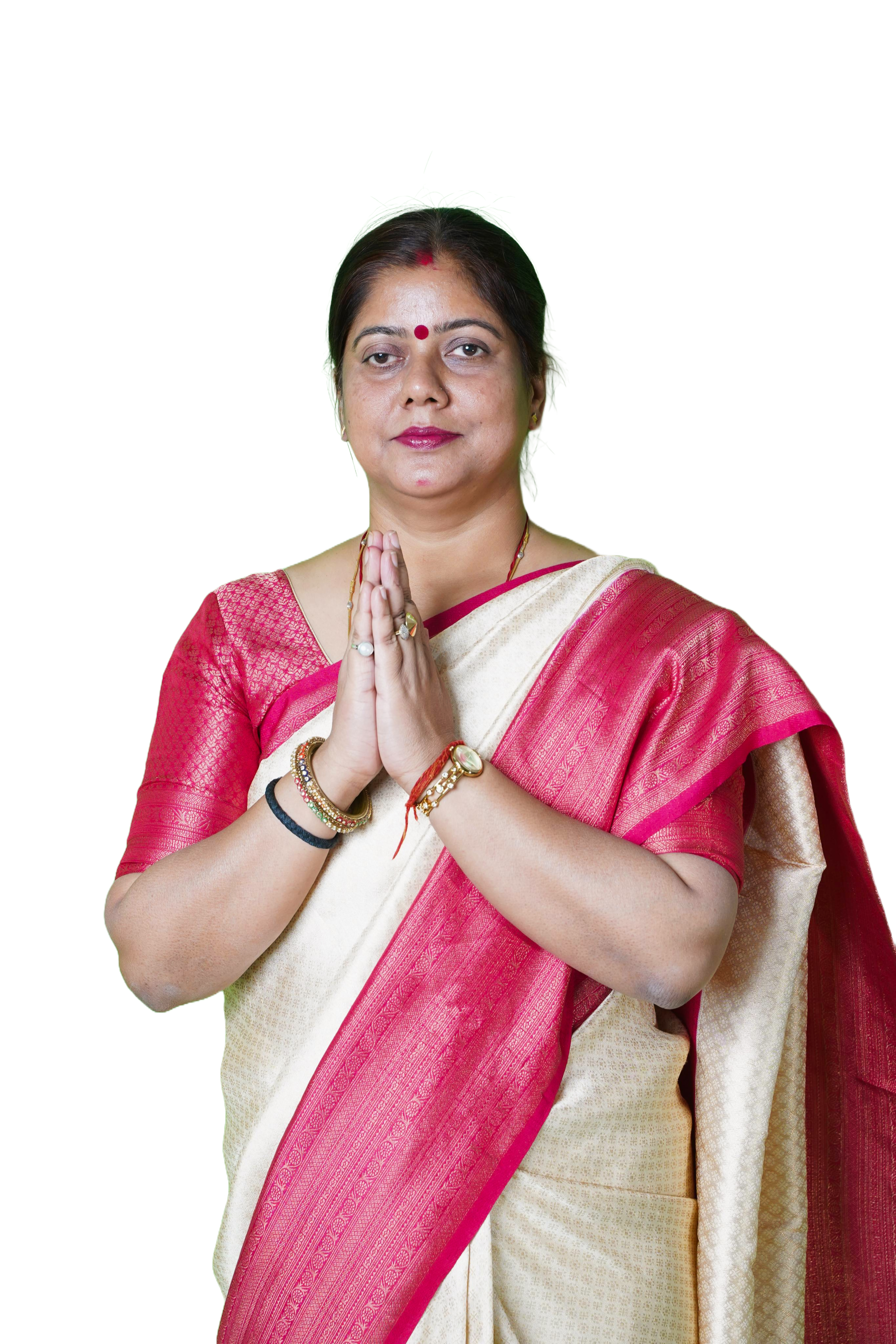
- Born: November 22, 1976 (age 49); Siliguri, India
- Education: Master of Science and Bachelor of Education
- Occupation: Politician

Shefali Gupta (born 22 November 1976) is a politician and social worker of the Bharatiya Janata Party (BJP), active in Jharkhand.

== Early life ==
Shefali was born in 1976 in the Indian state of West Bengal. She pursued her education with an MSc and Bachelor of Education from Banaras Hindu University, while she also holds a degree in Fashion Design.

== Career ==
Shefali has undertaken much interest in social welfare. From 2005 to 2010, she was associated with the[East Central Railway Women's Welfare Organisation (ECRWWO), where she worked extensively for those disabled and new-born. She also worked with the Divisional Railway Women's Welfare Organisation (DRWWO).

From 2014 to 2019, she worked with various groups to combat child and women trafficking, and between 2019 and 2021, she helped people in need during the COVID-19 pandemic.

Currently, she is an active member of the Bharatiya Janata Party and is involved in social welfare. For the first time, Karma Utsav was celebrated in Hazaribagh. Shefali made special arrangements for devotees during Rath Yatra. She is always ready to ensure that the Prime Minister's schemes are effectively implemented and reach the last person.
